John Ferguson (15 March 1830 – 30 March 1906) was a Scottish-born Australian politician. Born in Kenmore, Perthshire, he received a primary education before becoming a carpenter. He migrated to Australia in 1855, becoming a goldminer and carpenter, and then a builder and contractor at Rockhampton in Queensland.

He served on Rockhampton Council, including a period as mayor in 1880–1881. In 1881 he was elected to the Legislative Assembly of Queensland for Rockhampton, holding the seat until 1888. In 1894 he was appointed to the Queensland Legislative Council. He successfully contested the Australian Senate in the 1901 federal election for the Free Trade Party, but did not resign his seat in the Legislative Council. (Holding seats in both state and federal legislatures simultaneously was not yet forbidden by the Commonwealth Electoral Act 1902.)

Ferguson's interest remained in state politics and he seldom attended the Senate due to old age and illness, leading to his seat being declared vacant on 6 October 1903, shortly before the 1903 federal election, which Ferguson did not contest. He continued in the Legislative Council until his death in 1906. Ferguson was buried in the Waverley Cemetery.

References

 

Free Trade Party members of the Parliament of Australia
Members of the Australian Senate for Queensland
Members of the Australian Senate
Scottish emigrants to colonial Australia
1830 births
1906 deaths
Members of the Queensland Legislative Council
People from Banff and Buchan
Australian carpenters
Australian builders
19th-century Australian politicians
20th-century Australian politicians